The 2010 Junior League World Series took place from August 15–21 in Taylor, Michigan, United States. Taipei, Taiwan defeated Tyler, Texas in the championship game.

Teams

Results

United States Pool

International Pool

Elimination Round

References

Junior League World Series
Junior League World Series